William Easton (10 March 1904 – c.1982) was an English footballer who played at inside-forward for Blyth Spartans, Rotherham County, Montreal Maroons (Canada), Everton, Swansea Town, Port Vale, Aldershot, and Workington.

Career
Easton played for Eston, Blyth Spartans (in two spells), West Stanley (on trial), Rotherham County, Canadian side Montreal Maroons, Everton and Swansea Town, before joining Port Vale in May 1931. He scored on his debut on 29 August, in a 3–1 win over Plymouth Argyle at Home Park. He went on to score seven goals in 22 Second Division appearances in the 1931–32 season, but hardly featured at The Old Recreation Ground in the following season. He was given a free transfer in May 1933 and moved on to Aldershot and then Workington.

Career statistics
Source:

References

Footballers from Newcastle upon Tyne
English footballers
Association football forwards
Blyth Spartans A.F.C. players
Rotherham County F.C. players
English expatriate footballers
Expatriate soccer players in Canada
Everton F.C. players
Swansea City A.F.C. players
Port Vale F.C. players
Aldershot F.C. players
Workington A.F.C. players
English Football League players
1904 births
1982 deaths